Sidi Daoud is a town and commune in Algeria.

It may also refer to: 
 Zawiyet Sidi Daoud, a Sufi zawiya in Algeria.
 Sidi Daoud massacre, a massacre in Algeria.
 Sidi Daoud, Tunisia, a village in Tunisia.
 Ait Sidi Daoud, a commune in Morocco.